Fati Mohammed  (born 4 June 1979) is a Ghanaian women's international footballer who plays as a goalkeeper. She is a member of the Ghana women's national football team. She was part of the team at the 2003 FIFA Women's World Cup and 2007 FIFA Women's World Cup. On club level she plays for Robert Morris College in United States.

References

1979 births
Living people
Ghanaian women's footballers
Ghana women's international footballers
Place of birth missing (living people)
2003 FIFA Women's World Cup players
2007 FIFA Women's World Cup players
Women's association football goalkeepers
Expatriate women's soccer players in the United States
Ghanaian expatriate footballers
Ghanaian expatriate sportspeople in the United States
Robert Morris Eagles women's soccer players
Ghanaian expatriate women's footballers